Al-Bahluliyah is a town in northwestern Syria, administratively part of the Latakia Governorate, located north of Latakia. Nearby localities include Al-Shamiyah and Burj Islam to the west, Sitmarkho and al-Qanjarah to the southwest and al-Haffah to the southeast. According to the Syria Central Bureau of Statistics, al-Bahluliyah had a population of 4,665 in the 2004 census. Its inhabitants are predominantly Alawites.

References

Populated places in Latakia District
Towns in Syria
Alawite communities in Syria